{{Speciesbox
| image = Dalbergia horrida 01.JPG
| image_caption =
| genus = Dalbergia
| species = horrida
| authority = (Dennst.) Mabb.
| range_map = 
| range_map_caption =
| synonyms = 
 Amerimnon horridum Dennst. 
 Amerimnon sympatheticum  (Nimmo) Kuntze
 Dalbergia horrida var. horrida
 Dalbergia multiflora B.Heyne
 Dalbergia multiflora Prain
 Dalbergia sympathetica Nimmo
| synonyms_ref = 
}}Dalbergia horrida is a species of thorny liana, with the Vietnamese name trắc nhiều hoa (under the synonym D. multiflora = "many flowers") which is in the subfamily Faboideae and tribe Dalbergieae.

 Subspecies 
The Catalogue of Life lists:
 D. h. concanensis D. h. glabrescens (Prain) Thoth. & Nair
 D. h. horrida''

Gallery

References

External links

horrida
Flora of Indo-China
Flora of India (region)